Birender Singh Thapa (born 10 February 1953) is an Indian boxer. He competed in the men's light flyweight event at the 1980 Summer Olympics. At the 1980 Summer Olympics, he lost to Dietmar Geilich of East Germany.

References

External links
 

1953 births
Living people
Indian male boxers
Olympic boxers of India
Boxers at the 1980 Summer Olympics
Place of birth missing (living people)
Boxers at the 1978 Asian Games
Boxers at the 1982 Asian Games
Commonwealth Games medallists in boxing
Commonwealth Games bronze medallists for India
Boxers at the 1978 Commonwealth Games
Asian Games competitors for India
Light-flyweight boxers
Recipients of the Arjuna Award
Medallists at the 1978 Commonwealth Games